The State Prison at Møgelkær is a prison located in Møgelkær in Denmark. The place where the prison is now located was in the beginning a manor house. Later the location was used as a workplace for young unemployed people. From 1945 to 1973 the place was used as a youth prison until it was transformed into prison for adults inmates.

Capacity 
The State Prison at Møgelkær has a total capacity of 176 where 30 of whom are house in semi-open unit and 28 in a treatment and rehabilitation unit. The prison also have units for only women inmate and  a mixed where both men and women serve their sentences together. The prison mainly receives offenders from Jutland and from the Copenhagen area.

Employment 
The prisoners at the State Prison at Møgelkær have the opportunity to work in a large range of different jobs during their imprisonment. The prisoners at this prison mostly work with either maintenance of buildings, assembly work,
carpentry, metal work and forestry.

Education Programs 
The prisoners at the State Prison at Møgelkær can attend different education programs including Adult Education, Special Education, Support Education and self-tuition and competency courses.

Treatment Programs 
The prison offers drug and alcohol rehabilitation, cognitive proficiency and anger management programs and many other treatment programs.

External reference 
The Prisons own website
The State Prison at Møgelkær - The Danish Prison and Probation Service website

Prisons in Denmark